Frederick Franklin (1840 – May 10, 1873) was a United States Navy sailor who received the Medal of Honor for actions during the 1871 Korean Campaign.

Biography
Frederick H. Franklin was born in 1840 in Portsmouth, New Hampshire.

He, along with Boatswains Mate Alexander MacKenzie, Marine Private John Coleman, Ordinary Seaman Samuel F. Rogers and fellow Quartermaster William Troy in the attempt to save the life of Lieutenant Hugh McKee, who was mortally wounded in the action. Lieutenant McKee was not eligible for the medal as an officer.

He is buried in Proprietors' Cemetery, Portsmouth, New Hampshire.

Medal of Honor citation
Rank and organization: Quartermaster, U.S. Navy. Born: 1840, Portsmouth, N.H. Accredited to:  New Hampshire. G.O. No.: 169, February 8, 1872.

Citation:

On board the U.S.S. Colorado during the attack and capture of the Korean forts on 11 June 1871. Assuming command of Company D, after Lt. McKee was wounded, Franklin handled the company with great credit until relieved.

See also

List of Medal of Honor recipients

References

1840 births
1873 deaths
United States Navy Medal of Honor recipients
United States Navy sailors
People from Portsmouth, New Hampshire
Korean Expedition (1871) recipients of the Medal of Honor
Military personnel from New Hampshire